Saint Roch Giving Alms is an oil on canvas painting by Annibale Carraci, commissioned between 1587 and 1588 by the Confraternity of San Rocco in Reggio Emilia, a body for whom he produced several works. His largest work on panel or canvas (as opposed to fresco), it is the crowning achievement of his career before his move to Rome. Only completed in 1595, it is now in the Gemäldegalerie Alte Meister in Dresden, Germany.

History
The commission is dated by an 8 July 1595 letter to the commissioners from the artist stating it had been commissioned "seven years earlier" and came at almost exactly the same time as the commission for an Assumption of the Virgin altarpiece, now also in Dresden. It was intended for one of the long walls of the Confraternity's oratory, now destroyed, facing Saint Roch Healing Plague Victims, a c.1585 painting by Camillo Procaccini in an identical format, destroyed in the bombing of Dresden.

Analysis

Reception

Gallery

References

Collections of the Gemäldegalerie Alte Meister
Paintings by Annibale Carracci
Paintings of Saint Roch
1595 paintings
Este collection